Mogul Thrash is the sole album by English progressive rock band Mogul Thrash, released in 1971 by RCA Records.

Track listing 
Side One
 "Something Sad" (Roger Ball) 7:36
 "Elegy" (James Litherland) 9:36
 "Dreams of Glass & Sand" (James Litherland, Pete Brown) 5:09
Side Two
 "Going North, Going West" (James Litherland, Pete Brown) 12:01
 "St. Peter" (Alan Gorrie, John Wetton) 3:39
 "What's This I Hear" (James Litherland, Michael Rosen) 7:13

 "Sleeping in the Kitchen" (James Litherland, Roger Ball, Pete Brown) (2:45) released as a single, included on the 1999 reissue.

Personnel 
Mogul Thrash
 James Litherland - guitar, vocals
 John Wetton - bass, vocals, guitar
 Malcolm Duncan - tenor saxophone 
 Michael Rosen - trumpet, mellophone, guitar 
 Roger Ball -  soprano, alto and baritone saxophones, brass arrangements
 Bill Harrison - drums

Additional personnel
 Brian Auger - piano (2-2)
Technical
Eddy Offord - engineer
Graham McCallum - sleeve design

References 

 Eil.com (Mogul Thrash)
 Mogul Thrash  at 
 RCA (Mogul Thrash)
 Mogul Thrash at 

Mogul Thrash albums
1971 debut albums
RCA Records albums